Hurricane Katrina was a devastating Category 5 Atlantic hurricane that resulted in 1,392 fatalities and caused damage estimated between $97.4 billion to $145.5 billion in late August 2005, particularly in the city of New Orleans and its surrounding areas. At the time, it was the costliest tropical cyclone on record, tied now with Hurricane Harvey of 2017. Katrina was the twelfth tropical cyclone, the fifth hurricane, and the third major hurricane of the 2005 Atlantic hurricane season. It was also the fourth-most intense Atlantic hurricane on record to make landfall in the contiguous United States.

Katrina originated on August 23, 2005, as a result of the merger of a tropical wave and the remnants of Tropical Depression Ten. Early the following day, the depression intensified into a tropical storm and headed generally westward toward Florida. On August 25, two hours before making landfall at Hallandale Beach, it strengthened into a hurricane. After briefly weakening to tropical storm strength over southern Florida, Katrina entered the Gulf of Mexico on August 26 and rapidly intensified. The storm strengthened into a Category 5 hurricane over the warm waters of the Gulf of Mexico before weakening to a high-end Category 3 hurricane at its second landfall on August 29 over southeast Louisiana and Mississippi.

The majority of the loss of lives in Hurricane Katrina was due to flooding caused by fatal engineering flaws in the flood protection system, specifically the levee,  around the city of New Orleans. Eventually, 80% of the city, as well as large areas in neighboring parishes, were flooded for weeks. The flooding also destroyed most of New Orleans's transportation and communication facilities, leaving tens of thousands of people who did not evacuate the city prior to landfall with little access to food, shelter, and other basic necessities. The disaster in New Orleans prompted a massive national and international response effort, including federal, local, and private rescue operations to evacuate those displaced from the city in the following weeks. After the storm, multiple investigations concluded that the U.S. Army Corps of Engineers, which had designed and built the region's levees decades earlier, was responsible for the failure of the flood-control systems. However, federal courts later ruled that the Corps could not be held financially liable due of sovereign immunity in the Flood Control Act of 1928.

The emergency response from federal, state, and local governments was widely criticized, leading to the resignation of Federal Emergency Management Agency (FEMA) director Michael D. Brown and New Orleans Police Department (NOPD) Superintendent Eddie Compass. Many other government officials faced criticism for their responses, especially New Orleans Mayor Ray Nagin, Louisiana Governor Kathleen Blanco, and President George W. Bush. However, several agencies, such as the United States Coast Guard (USCG), National Hurricane Center (NHC), and National Weather Service (NWS), were commended for their actions, with the NHC being particularly praised for its accurate forecasts well in advance. Katrina was the earliest 11th named storm on record, before being surpassed by Tropical Storm Kyle on August 14, 2020. As a result of the destruction and loss of life caused by the storm, the name Katrina was officially retired by the World Meteorological Organization in April 2006.

Meteorological history

Hurricane Katrina originated from the merger of a tropical wave and the mid-level remnants of Tropical Depression Ten on August 19, 2005, near the Lesser Antilles. On August 23, the disturbance organized into Tropical Depression Twelve over the southeastern Bahamas. The storm strengthened into Tropical Storm Katrina on the morning of August 24. The tropical storm moved towards Florida and became a hurricane only two hours before making landfall between Hallandale Beach and Aventura on the morning of August 25. The storm weakened over land, but it regained hurricane status about one hour after entering the Gulf of Mexico, and it continued strengthening over open waters. On August 27, the storm reached Category 3 intensity on the Saffir-Simpson hurricane wind scale, becoming the third major hurricane of the season. An eyewall replacement cycle disrupted the intensification but caused the storm to nearly double in size. Thereafter, Katrina rapidly intensified over the "unusually warm" waters of the Loop Current, from a Category 3 hurricane to a Category 5 hurricane in just nine hours.

The pressure measurement made Katrina the fifth most intense Atlantic hurricane on record at the time, only to be surpassed by Hurricanes Rita and Wilma later in the season; it was also the strongest hurricane ever recorded in the Gulf of Mexico at the time, before Rita broke the record. The hurricane subsequently weakened due to another eyewall replacement cycle, and Katrina made its second landfall at 1110 UTC on August 29, as a high end Category 3 hurricane with sustained winds of 125 mph (205 km/h), near Buras-Triumph, Louisiana. After moving over southeastern Louisiana and Breton Sound, it made its third and final landfall near the Louisiana–Mississippi border with  sustained winds, still at a mid range Category 3 hurricane intensity. It was downgraded to a tropical depression near Clarksville, Tennessee; its remnants were absorbed by a cold front in the eastern Great Lakes region on August 31. The resulting extratropical storm moved rapidly to the northeast and affected eastern Canada.

Preparations

Federal government

The United States Coast Guard began pre-positioning resources in a ring around the expected impact zone and activated more than 400 reservists. On August 27, it moved its personnel out of the New Orleans region prior to the mandatory evacuation. Aircrews from the Aviation Training Center, in Mobile, staged rescue aircraft from Texas to Florida. All aircraft were returning towards the Gulf of Mexico by the afternoon of August 29.  Aircrews, many of whom lost their homes during the hurricane, began a round-the-clock rescue effort in New Orleans, and along the Mississippi and Alabama coastlines.

President George W. Bush declared a state of emergency in selected regions of Louisiana, Alabama, and Mississippi on August 27. "On Sunday, August 28, President Bush spoke with Governor Blanco to encourage her to order a mandatory evacuation of New Orleans." However, during the testimony by former Federal Emergency Management Agency (FEMA) chief Michael Brown before a U.S. House subcommittee on September 26, Representative Stephen Buyer (R-IN) inquired as to why Bush's declaration of state of emergency of August 27 had not included the coastal parishes of Orleans, Jefferson, and Plaquemines. The declaration actually did not include any of Louisiana's coastal parishes, whereas the coastal counties were included in the declarations for Mississippi and Alabama. Brown testified that this was because Louisiana Governor Blanco had not included those parishes in her initial request for aid, a decision that he found "shocking". After the hearing, Blanco released a copy of her letter, which showed she had requested assistance for "all the southeastern parishes including the City of New Orleans" as well specifically naming 14 parishes, including Jefferson, Orleans, St. Bernard, and Plaquemines.

Voluntary and mandatory evacuations were issued for large areas of southeast Louisiana as well as coastal Mississippi and Alabama. About 1.2 million residents of the Gulf Coast were covered under a voluntary or mandatory evacuation order.

National Oceanic and Atmospheric Administration (NOAA)
On the afternoon of August 26, the National Hurricane Center (NHC) realized that Katrina had yet to make the turn toward the Florida Panhandle and ended up revising the predicted track of the storm from the panhandle to the Mississippi coast. The National Weather Service's New Orleans/Baton Rouge office issued a vividly worded bulletin on August 28 predicting that the area would be "uninhabitable for weeks" after "devastating damage" caused by Katrina, which at that time rivaled the intensity of Hurricane Camille. During video conferences involving the president later that day and on August 29, NHC director Max Mayfield expressed concern that Katrina might push its storm surge over the city's levees and flood walls. In one conference, he stated, "I do not think anyone can tell you with confidence right now whether the levees will be topped or not, but that's obviously a very, very great concern."

Florida and Gulf Coast
In Florida, Governor Jeb Bush declared a state of emergency on August 24 in advance of Hurricane Katrina's landfall. By the following day, Florida's Emergency Operations Center was activated in Tallahassee to monitor the progress of the hurricane. Before Katrina moved ashore, schools and businesses were closed in the Miami area. Cruise ships altered their paths due to seaports in southeastern Florida closing. Officials in Miami-Dade County advised residents in mobile homes or with special needs to evacuate. To the north in Broward County, residents east of the Intracoastal Waterway or in mobile homes were advised to leave their homes. Evacuation orders were issued for offshore islands in Palm Beach County, and for residents in mobile homes south of Lantana Road. Additionally, a mandatory evacuation was ordered for vulnerable housing in Martin County. Shelters were opened across the region. Officials closed the Miami International Airport, Fort Lauderdale–Hollywood International Airport, Key West International Airport, and Florida Keys Marathon Airport due to the storm. In Monroe and Collier counties, schools were closed, and a shelter was opened in Immokalee.

On August 28, Alabama Governor Bob Riley declared a state of emergency for the approaching Hurricane Katrina. On the same day, he requested President Bush to declare "expedited major disaster declaration" for six counties of South Alabama, which was quickly approved. Three hundred fifty national guardsmen were called on duty by August 30. The state of Mississippi activated its National Guard on August 26 in preparation for the storm's landfall. Additionally, the state government activated its Emergency Operations Center the next day, and local governments began issuing evacuation orders. By 6:00 pm CDT on August 28, 11 counties and cities issued evacuation orders, a number which increased to 41 counties and 61 cities by the following morning. Moreover, 57 emergency shelters were established on coastal communities, with 31 additional shelters available to open if needed.

By Sunday, August 28, most infrastructure along the Gulf Coast had been shut down, including all freight and Amtrak rail traffic into the evacuation areas as well as the Waterford Nuclear Generating Station. Since Hurricane Katrina, Amtrak's Sunset Limited service has never been restored past New Orleans.

Louisiana

In Louisiana, the state's hurricane evacuation plan calls for local governments in areas along and near the coast to evacuate in three phases, starting with the immediate coast 50 hours before the start of tropical-storm-force winds. Persons in areas designated Phase II begin evacuating 40 hours before the onset of tropical storm winds and those in Phase III areas (including New Orleans) evacuate 30 hours before the start of such winds. Many private caregiving facilities that relied on bus companies and ambulance services for evacuation were unable to evacuate their charges because they waited too long. Louisiana's Emergency Operations Plan Supplement 1C (Part II, Section II, Paragraph D) calls for use of school and other public buses in evacuations. Although buses that later flooded were available to transport those dependent upon public transportation, not enough bus drivers were available to drive them as Governor Blanco did not sign an emergency waiver to allow any licensed driver to transport evacuees on school buses.

By August 26, many of the computer models had shifted the potential path of Katrina  westward from the Florida Panhandle, putting the city of New Orleans directly in the center of their track probabilities; the chances of a direct hit were forecast at 17%, with strike probability rising to 29% by August 28. This scenario was considered a potential catastrophe because some parts of New Orleans and the metro area are below sea level.

At a news conference at 10 a.m. EDT on August 28, shortly after Katrina was upgraded to a Category 5 storm, New Orleans mayor Ray Nagin ordered the first-ever mandatory evacuation of the city, calling Katrina "a storm that most of us have long feared". The city government also established several "refuges of last resort" for citizens who could not leave the city, including the massive Louisiana Superdome, which sheltered approximately 26,000 people and provided them with food and water for several days as the storm came ashore. Some estimates claimed that 80% of the 1.3 million residents of the greater New Orleans metropolitan area evacuated, leaving behind substantially fewer people than remained in the city during the Hurricane Ivan evacuation.

Impact

On August 29, 2005, Katrina's storm surge caused 53 breaches to various flood protection structures in and around the greater New Orleans area, submerging 80% of the city. A June 2007 report by the American Society of Civil Engineers indicated that two-thirds of the flooding was caused by the multiple failures of the city's floodwalls. The storm surge also devastated the coasts of Mississippi and Alabama, making Katrina one of the most destructive hurricanes, the costliest natural disaster in the history of the United States (tied with Hurricane Harvey in 2017), and the deadliest hurricane since the 1928 Okeechobee hurricane. The total damage from Katrina is estimated at $125 billion (2005 U.S. dollars). However, in February 2021, a severe winter storm struck the United States, causing at least $195 billion (2021 USD) in damage in Texas. It surpassed both Katrina and Harvey to become the single-costliest natural disaster recorded in the United States.

The death toll from Katrina is uncertain, with reports differing by hundreds. According to the National Hurricane Center, 1,836 fatalities can be attributed to the storm: 1 in Kentucky, 2 each in Alabama, Georgia, and Ohio, 14 in Florida, 238 in Mississippi, and 1,577 in Louisiana. However, 135 people remain categorized as missing in Louisiana, and many of the deaths are indirect, but it is almost impossible to determine the exact cause of some of the fatalities. A 2008 report by the Disaster Medicine and Public Health Preparedness journal indicates that 966 deaths can be directly attributed to the storm in Louisiana, including out of state evacuees, and another 20 indirectly (such as firearm-related deaths and gas poisoning). Due to uncertain causes of death with 454 evacuees, an upper-bound of 1,440 is noted in the paper. A follow-up study by the Louisiana Department of Health & Hospitals determined that the storm was directly responsible for 1,170 fatalities in Louisiana.

Federal disaster declarations covered  of the United States, an area almost as large as the United Kingdom. The hurricane left an estimated three million people without electricity. On September 3, 2005, Homeland Security Secretary Michael Chertoff described the aftermath of Hurricane Katrina as "probably the worst catastrophe or set of catastrophes", in the country's history, referring to the hurricane itself plus the flooding of New Orleans.

Even in 2010, debris remained in some coastal communities.

Florida, Bahamas, and Cuba

Hurricane Katrina first made landfall between Hallandale Beach and Aventura, Florida on August 25. As a result, local flooding occurred in Miami-Dade County, damaging approximately 100 homes. Farther south in the Florida Keys, a tornado was spawned in Marathon on August 26. The tornado damaged a hangar at the airport there and caused an estimated $5 million in damage. The rains caused flooding, and the combination of rains and winds downed trees and power lines, leaving 1.45 million people without power. Damage in South Florida was estimated at $523 million, mostly as a result of crop damage. Twelve deaths occurred in South Florida, of which three were caused by downed trees in Broward County, three from drowning in Miami-Dade County, three were from carbon monoxide poisoning caused by generators, one was due to a vehicle accident, one occurred during debris cleanup, and one was associated with a lack of electricity.

Significant impacts were also reported in the Florida Panhandle. Although Katrina moved ashore in Louisiana and Mississippi, its outer periphery produced a 5.37 ft (1.64 m) storm surge in Pensacola. High waves caused beach erosion and closed nearby roadways. There were five tornadoes in the northwestern portion of the state, though none of them caused significant damage. Throughout the Florida Panhandle, the storm resulted in an estimated $100 million in damage. There were two indirect fatalities from Katrina in Walton County as a result of a traffic accident. In the Florida Panhandle, 77,000 customers lost power. Overall, the hurricane killed 14 people and caused at least $623 million in damage.

Before striking South Florida, Katrina traversed the Bahamas as a tropical storm. However, minimal impact was reported, with only "fresh breezes" on various islands.

Although Hurricane Katrina stayed well to the north of Cuba, on August 28 it brought tropical-storm-force winds and rainfall of over 8 in (200 mm) to western regions of the island. Telephone and power lines were damaged and around 8,000 people were evacuated in the Pinar del Río Province. According to Cuban television reports the coastal town of Surgidero de Batabanó was 90% underwater.

Louisiana

On August 29, 2005, Hurricane Katrina made landfall near Buras-Triumph, Louisiana, with  winds, as a strong Category 3 hurricane. Although the storm surge to the east of the path of the eye in Mississippi was higher, a significant surge affected the Louisiana coast. The hurricane made its final landfall near the mouth of the Pearl River, with the eye straddling St. Tammany Parish, Louisiana, and Hancock County, Mississippi, on the morning of August 29 at about 9:45 AM CST.

Hurricane Katrina also brought heavy rain to Louisiana, with  falling on a wide swath of the eastern part of the state. In the area around Slidell, the rainfall was even higher, and the highest rainfall recorded in the state was approximately 15 inches (380 mm). As a result of the rainfall and storm surge the level of Lake Pontchartrain rose and caused significant flooding along its northeastern shore, affecting communities from Slidell to Mandeville. Several bridges were destroyed, including the I-10 Twin Span Bridge connecting Slidell to New Orleans. Almost 900,000 people in Louisiana lost power as a result of Hurricane Katrina.

Katrina's storm surge inundated all parishes surrounding Lake Pontchartrain, including St. Tammany, Tangipahoa, St. John the Baptist, and St. Charles Parishes. St. Tammany Parish received a two-part storm surge. The first surge came as Lake Pontchartrain rose and the storm blew water from the Gulf of Mexico into the lake. The second came as the eye of Katrina passed, westerly winds pushed water into a bottleneck at the Rigolets Pass, forcing it farther inland.

Hard-hit St. Bernard Parish was flooded because of breaching of the levees that contained a navigation channel called the Mississippi River Gulf Outlet (MR-GO) and the breach of the 40 Arpent canal levee that was designed and built by the Orleans Levee Board. The search for the missing was undertaken by the St. Bernard Fire Department because of the assets of the United States Coast Guard being diverted to New Orleans. In the months after the storm, many of the missing were tracked down by searching flooded homes, tracking credit card records, and visiting homes of family and relatives.

According to the U.S. Dept. of Housing and Urban Development, in St. Bernard Parish, 81% (20,229) of the housing units were damaged. In St. Tammany Parish, 70% (48,792) were damaged and in Plaquemines Parish 80% (7,212) were damaged.

In addition, the combined effect of Hurricanes Katrina and Rita was the destruction of an estimated  of coastal wetlands in Louisiana.

New Orleans

As the eye of Hurricane Katrina swept to the northeast, it subjected the city to hurricane conditions for hours. Although power failures prevented accurate measurement of wind speeds in New Orleans, there were a few measurements of hurricane-force winds; based on this information, the NHC concluded that much of the city likely experienced sustained winds of Category 1 or 2 hurricane strength.

Katrina's storm surge caused 53 levee breaches in the federally built levee system protecting metro New Orleans and the failure of the 40 Arpent Canal levee. Failures occurred in New Orleans and surrounding communities, especially St. Bernard Parish. The Mississippi River Gulf Outlet (MR-GO) breached its levees in approximately 20 places, flooding much of eastern New Orleans, most of St. Bernard Parish and the East Bank of Plaquemines Parish. The major levee breaches in the city included breaches at the 17th Street Canal levee, the London Avenue Canal, and the wide, navigable Industrial Canal, which left approximately 80% of the city flooded.

Most of the major roads traveling into and out of the city were damaged. The only major intact highway routes out of the city were the westbound Crescent City Connection and the Huey P. Long Bridge, as large portions of the I-10 Twin Span Bridge traveling eastbound towards Slidell, Louisiana had collapsed. Both the Lake Pontchartrain Causeway and the Crescent City Connection only carried emergency traffic. However, access to downtown New Orleans and the "shelter of last resort" at the Convention Center was never closed because River Road in Jefferson Parish and Leake Avenue and Tchoupitoulas Street in New Orleans were not flooded, and would have allowed access throughout the immediate post-storm emergency period.

On August 29, at 7:40 am CDT, it was reported that most of the windows on the north side of the Hyatt Regency New Orleans had been blown out, and many other high rise buildings had extensive window damage. The Hyatt was the most severely damaged hotel in the city, with beds reported to be flying out of the windows. Insulation tubes were exposed as the hotel's glass exterior was completely sheared off.

The Superdome, which was sheltering many people who had not evacuated, sustained significant damage. Two sections of the Superdome's roof were compromised and the dome's waterproof membrane was essentially peeled off. Louis Armstrong New Orleans International Airport was closed before the storm but did not flood. On August 30, it was reopened to humanitarian and rescue operations. Limited commercial passenger service resumed at the airport on September 13 and regular carrier operations resumed in early October.

Levee breaches in New Orleans also caused a significant number of deaths, with over 700 bodies recovered in New Orleans by October 23, 2005. Some survivors and evacuees reported seeing dead bodies lying in city streets and floating in still-flooded sections, especially in the east of the city. The advanced state of decomposition of many corpses, some of which were left in the water or sun for days before being collected, hindered efforts by coroners to identify many of the dead.

The first deaths reported from the city were reported shortly before midnight on August 28, as three nursing home patients died during an evacuation to Baton Rouge, most likely from dehydration. An estimated 215 bodies were found in nursing homes and hospitals in New Orleans, the largest number being at Memorial Medical Center where 45 corpses were recovered. Some 200 patients at Charity Hospital were not evacuated until Friday, September 2, having been without power or fresh water for five days. While there were also early reports of fatalities amid mayhem at the Superdome, only six deaths were confirmed there, with four of these originating from natural causes, one from a drug overdose, and one a suicide. At the Convention Center, four bodies were recovered. One of the four is believed to be the result of a homicide.

There is evidence that many prisoners were abandoned in their cells during the storm, while the guards sought shelter. Hundreds of prisoners were later registered as "unaccounted for".

Mississippi

The Gulf coast of Mississippi suffered extremely severe damage from the impact of Hurricane Katrina on August 29, leaving 238 people dead, 67 missing, and billions of dollars in damage: bridges, barges, boats, piers, houses, and cars were washed inland. Katrina traveled up the entire state; as a result, all 82 counties in Mississippi were declared disaster areas for federal assistance, 47 for full assistance.

Hurricane Katrina brought strong winds to Mississippi, which caused significant tree damage throughout the state.

The storm also brought heavy rains with  falling in southwestern Mississippi and rain in excess of 4 inches (100 mm) falling throughout the majority of the state. Katrina caused eleven tornadoes in Mississippi on August 29, some of which damaged trees and power lines.

Battered by wind, rain and storm surge, some beachfront neighborhoods were completely leveled. One apartment complex with approximately thirty residents seeking shelter inside collapsed. More than half of the 13 casinos in the state, which were floated on barges to comply with Mississippi land-based gambling laws, were washed hundreds of yards inland by waves.

A number of streets and bridges were washed away. On U.S. Highway 90 along the Mississippi Gulf Coast, two major bridges were completely destroyed: the Bay St. Louis–Pass Christian bridge, and the Biloxi–Ocean Springs bridge. In addition, the eastbound span of the I-10 bridge over the Pascagoula River estuary was damaged. In the weeks after the storm, with the connectivity of the coastal U.S. Highway 90 shattered, traffic traveling parallel to the coast was reduced first to State Road 11 (parallel to I-10) then to two lanes on the remaining I-10 span when it was opened.

All three coastal counties of the state were severely affected by the storm. Katrina's surge was the most extensive, as well as the highest, in the documented history of the United States; large portions of Hancock, Harrison, and Jackson counties were inundated by the storm surge, in all three cases affecting most of the populated areas. Surge covered almost the entire lower half of Hancock County, destroying the coastal communities of Clermont Harbor and Waveland, much of Bay St. Louis, and flowed up the Jourdan River, flooding Diamondhead and Kiln. In Harrison County, Pass Christian was completely inundated, along with a narrow strip of land to the east along the coast, which includes the cities of Long Beach and Gulfport; the flooding was more extensive in communities such as D'Iberville, which borders Back Bay. Biloxi, on a peninsula between the Back Bay and the coast, was particularly hard hit, especially the low-lying Point Cadet area. In Jackson County, storm surge flowed up the wide river estuary, with the combined surge and freshwater flooding cutting the county in half. Other large Jackson County neighborhoods such as Porteaux Bay and Gulf Hills were severely damaged with large portions being completely destroyed, and St. Martin was hard hit; Ocean Springs, Moss Point, Gautier and Escatawpa also suffered major surge damage.

Mississippi Emergency Management Agency officials also recorded deaths in Forrest, Hinds, Warren, and Leake counties. Over 900,000 people throughout the state experienced power outages.

Southeast United States

Although Hurricane Katrina made landfall well to the west, Alabama and the Florida Panhandle were both affected by tropical-storm-force winds and a storm surge varying from  around Mobile Bay, with higher waves on top. The surge caused significant flooding several miles inland along Mobile Bay. Four tornadoes were also reported in Alabama. Ships, oil rigs, boats and fishing piers were washed ashore along Mobile Bay: the cargo ship M/V Caribbean Clipper and many fishing boats were grounded at Bayou La Batre.

An oil rig under construction along the Mobile River broke its moorings and floated  northwards before striking the Cochrane Bridge just outside Mobile. No significant damage resulted to the bridge and it was soon reopened. The damage on Dauphin Island was severe, with the surge destroying many houses and cutting a new canal through the western portion of the island. An offshore oil rig also became grounded on the island. As in Mississippi, the storm surge caused significant beach erosion along the Alabama coastline. More than 600,000 people lost power in Alabama as a result of Hurricane Katrina and two people died in a traffic accident in the state. Residents in some areas, such as Selma, were without power for several days.

Northern and central Georgia were affected by heavy rains and strong winds from Hurricane Katrina as the storm moved inland, with more than 3 inches (75 mm) of rain falling in several areas. At least 18 tornadoes formed in Georgia on August 29, 2005, the most on record in that state for one day in August. The most serious of these tornadoes was an F2 tornado which affected Heard County and Carroll County. This tornado caused three injuries and one fatality and damaged several houses. The other tornadoes caused significant damages to buildings and agricultural facilities. In addition to the fatality caused by the F2 tornado, there was another fatality in a traffic accident.

Eastern Arkansas received light rain from the passage of Katrina. Gusty winds downed some trees and power lines, though damage was minimal. Katrina also caused a number of power outages in many areas, with over 100,000 customers affected in Tennessee, primarily in the Memphis and Nashville areas.

Other U.S. states and Canada

In Kentucky, rainfall from Katrina compounded flooding from a storm that had moved through during the previous weekend. A 10-year-old girl drowned in Hopkinsville. Dozens of businesses were closed and several families evacuated due to rising floodwaters. As a result of the flooding, Kentucky Governor Ernie Fletcher declared three counties disaster areas and a statewide state of emergency. Additionally, wind gusts up to  resulted in some damage. Downed trees and power lines were reported in several counties in western Kentucky, especially Calloway and Christian counties. Overall, more than 10,000 utility customers in western Kentucky experienced power outages. The remnants of Katrina spawned a tornado in Virginia, damaging at least 13 homes in Marshall. In addition, approximately 4,000 people lost electricity. Over  of rain fell in portions of West Virginia, causing localized flooding in several counties. At least 103 homes and 7 buildings suffered some degree of water damage. A number of roads and bridges were inundated or washed out. Numerous streams and rivers overflowed their banks, forcing the closure of several roads, including Interstate 90 in Cleveland. Two deaths occurred due to a flood-related automobile accident in Huron County. Additionally, hundreds of homes and businesses suffered flood damage.

Katrina spawned five tornadoes in Pennsylvania, though none resulted in significant damage. Gusty winds also left approximately 4,500 people in Buffalo without electricity. The remnants of Katrina brought  of rain to portions of Massachusetts, causing flash flooding in Bristol and Plymouth counties. Several roads were closed due to floodwater inundation in Acushnet, Dartmouth, New Bedford, and Wareham, including Route 18 in New Bedford. Very minimal impact was reported in Rhode Island, with winds downing a tree and two electrical poles in the city of Warwick. In Vermont,  of rain in Chittenden County caused cars to hydroplane on Interstate 89, resulting in many automobile accidents. The storm brought  of precipitation to isolated areas of Maine and up to  near Patten. Several roads were inundated or washed out by overflowing brooks and streams, including sections of U.S. Route 1 and Maine routes 11 and 159. Several structures and one parked vehicle were also affected by the waters. Wind gusts up to  also impacted parts of Maine, felling trees and causing power outages in Bar Harbor, Blue Hill, Dover-Foxcroft, Sedgwick Ridge, and Sorrento.

Severe local flooding occurred in Quebec, forcing the evacuations of dozens of homes in some communities as rivers began overflowing their banks and sewage systems were becoming overwhelmed by the influx of precipitation. Inundated and washed out roads, including Route 138 along the north shore of the Saint Lawrence River, Route 172 north of Tadoussac, and Route 385 near Forestville left several communities isolated for at least a week.

Aftermath

Economic effects

The economic effects of the storm reached high levels. The Bush Administration sought $105 billion for repairs and reconstruction in the region, which did not account for damage to the economy caused by potential interruption of the oil supply, destruction of the Gulf Coast's highway infrastructure, and exports of commodities such as grain. Katrina damaged or destroyed 30 oil platforms and caused the closure of nine refineries; the total shut-in oil production from the Gulf of Mexico in the six-month period following Katrina was approximately 24% of the annual production and the shut-in gas production for the same period was about 18%. The total loss to the forestry industry from Katrina is calculated to rise to about $5 billion. Furthermore, hundreds of thousands of local residents were left unemployed. Before the hurricane, the region supported approximately one million non-farm jobs, with 600,000 of them in New Orleans. It is estimated that the total economic impact in Louisiana and Mississippi may eventually exceed $150 billion. Forensic accountants were involved in the assessment of economic damages resulting from this catastrophe.

Katrina displaced over one million people from the central Gulf coast to elsewhere across the United States, becoming the largest diaspora in the history of the United States. Houston, Texas, had an increase of 35,000 people; Mobile, Alabama, gained over 24,000; Baton Rouge, Louisiana, over 15,000; and Hammond, Louisiana, received over 10,000, nearly doubling its size. Chicago, Illinois received over 6,000 people, the most of any non-southern city. By late January 2006, about 200,000 people were once again living in New Orleans, less than half of the pre-storm population. By July 1, 2006, when new population estimates were calculated by the U.S. Census Bureau, the state of Louisiana showed a population decline of 219,563 or 4.87%. Additionally, some insurance companies have stopped insuring homeowners in the area because of the high costs from Hurricanes Katrina and Rita, or have raised homeowners' insurance premiums to cover their risk.

Environmental effects

Katrina also had a profound impact on the environment. The storm surge caused substantial beach erosion, in some cases completely devastating coastal areas. The storm surge and waves from Katrina also severely damaged the Chandeleur Islands, which had been affected by Hurricane Ivan the previous year. The US Geological Survey has estimated  of land was transformed to water by the hurricanes Katrina and Rita. Before the storm, subsidence and erosion caused loss of land in the Louisiana wetlands and bayous. This, along with the canals built in the area, let Katrina keep more of its intensity when it struck. The lands that were lost were breeding grounds for marine mammals, brown pelicans, turtles, and fish, and migratory species such as redhead ducks. Overall, about 20% of the local marshes were permanently overrun by water as a result of the storm.

The damage from Katrina forced the closure of 16 National Wildlife Refuges. Breton National Wildlife Refuge lost half its area in the storm. As a result, the hurricane affected the habitats of sea turtles, Mississippi sandhill cranes, red-cockaded woodpeckers, and Alabama Beach mice.

Katrina produced massive tree loss along the Gulf Coast, particularly in Louisiana's Pearl River Basin and among bottomland hardwood forests. Before the storm, the standard mortality rate for the area's trees was 1.9%, but this interval increased to 20.5% by the end of 2006. Delayed mortality as an effect of the storm continued with rates up to 5% until 2011. This significant loss in biomass caused greater decay and an increase in carbon emissions. For example, by 2006 the decreased biomass in bottomland hardwood forests contributed an amount of carbon which equated to roughly 140% of the net annual U.S. carbon sink in forest trees.

Some spills were only a few hundred gallons and most were contained on-site, though some oil entered the ecosystem and residential areas. After a spill at the Murphy Oil refinery, for example, 1,800 homes were oiled in the towns of Chalmette and Meraux. Unlike Hurricane Ivan, no offshore oil spills were officially reported after Hurricane Katrina. However, Skytruth reported some signs of surface oil in the Gulf of Mexico.

Finally, as part of the cleanup effort, the floodwaters that covered New Orleans were pumped into Lake Pontchartrain, a process that took 43 days to complete. These residual waters contained a mix of raw sewage, bacteria, heavy metals, pesticides, toxic chemicals, and oil, which sparked fears in the scientific community of massive numbers of fish dying.

Reestablishing governance

Shortly after the hurricane moved away on August 30, 2005, some residents of New Orleans who remained in the city began looting stores. Many were in search of food and water that were not available to them through any other means, as well as non-essential items. Additionally, there were reports of carjacking, murders, thefts, and rapes in New Orleans. Some sources later determined that many of the reports were inaccurate, greatly exaggerated or completely false, leading news agencies to print retractions.

Thousands of National Guard and federal troops were mobilized and sent to Louisiana, with 7,841 in the area on August 29, to a maximum of 46,838 on September 10. A number of local law enforcement agents from across the country were temporarily deputized by the state. "They have M16s and are locked and loaded. These troops know how to shoot and kill and I expect they will", Louisiana Governor Kathleen Blanco said. Congressman Bill Jefferson told ABC News: "There was shooting going on. There was sniping going on. Over the first week of September, law and order were gradually restored to the city." Several shootings occurred between police and New Orleans residents, some involving police misconduct; including an incident where police officers killed two unarmed civilians and seriously injured four others at Danziger Bridge. Five former police officers pleaded guilty to charges connected to the Danziger Bridge shootings in the aftermath of the hurricane. Six other former or existing officers appeared in court in June 2011.

Overall, a number of arrests were made throughout the affected area, including some near the New Orleans Convention Center. A temporary jail was constructed of chain link cages in the New Orleans Union Passenger Terminal, the city's main train station.

In West Virginia, where roughly 350 refugees were located, local officials took fingerprints to run criminal background checks on the refugees. The background checks found that 45% of the refugees had a criminal record of some nature, and that 22% had a violent criminal record. Media speculation fueled a popular perception that the displaced New Orleans residents brought a wave of crime into the communities where they relocated, however, detailed studies of crime statistics in these communities did not reveal a significant increase in violent crime.

Government response

Within the United States and as delineated in the National Response Plan, disaster response and planning is first and foremost a local government responsibility. When local government exhausts its resources, it then requests specific additional resources from the county level. The request process proceeds similarly from the county to the state to the federal government as additional resource needs are identified. Many of the problems that arose developed from inadequate planning and back-up communication systems at various levels.

Some disaster relief response to Katrina began before the storm, with the Federal Emergency Management Agency (FEMA) preparations that ranged from logistical supply deployments to a mortuary team with refrigerated trucks. A network of volunteers began rendering assistance to local residents and residents emerging from New Orleans and surrounding parishes as soon as the storm made landfall (even though many were directed to not enter the area), and continued for more than six months after the storm

Of the 60,000 people stranded in New Orleans, the Coast Guard rescued more than 33,500. Congress recognized the Coast Guard's response with an official entry in the Congressional Record, and the Armed Service was awarded the Presidential Unit Citation.

The United States Northern Command established Joint Task Force (JTF) Katrina based out of Camp Shelby, Mississippi, to act as the military's on-scene response on Sunday, August 28, with US Army Lieutenant General Russel L. Honoré as commander. Approximately 58,000 National Guard personnel were activated to deal with the storm's aftermath, with troops coming from all 50 states. The Department of Defense also activated volunteer members of the Civil Air Patrol.

Michael Chertoff, Secretary of the Department of Homeland Security, decided to take over the federal, state, and local operations officially on August 30, 2005, citing the National Response Plan. This was refused by Governor Blanco who indicated that her National Guard could manage. Early in September, Congress authorized a total of $62.3 billion in aid for victims. Additionally, President Bush enlisted the help of former presidents Bill Clinton and George H. W. Bush to raise additional voluntary contributions, much as they did after the 2004 Indian Ocean earthquake and tsunami. American flags were also ordered to be half-staff from September 2, 2005, to September 20, 2005, in honor of the victims.

FEMA provided housing assistance (rental assistance, trailers, etc.) to more than 700,000 applicants—families and individuals. However, only one-fifth of the trailers requested in Orleans Parish were supplied, resulting in an enormous housing shortage in the city of New Orleans. Many local areas voted to not allow the trailers, and many areas had no utilities, a requirement prior to placing the trailers. To provide for additional housing, FEMA has also paid for the hotel costs of 12,000 individuals and families displaced by Katrina through February 7, 2006, when a final deadline was set for the end of hotel cost coverage. After this deadline, evacuees were still eligible to receive federal assistance, which could be used towards either apartment rent, additional hotel stays, or fixing their ruined homes, although FEMA no longer paid for hotels directly. As of March 30, 2010, there were still 260 families living in FEMA-provided trailers in Louisiana and Mississippi.

Law enforcement and public safety agencies, from across the United States, provided a "mutual aid" response to Louisiana and New Orleans in the weeks following the disaster. Many agencies responded with manpower and equipment from as far away as California, Michigan, Nevada, New York, and Texas. This response was welcomed by local Louisiana authorities as their staff were either becoming fatigued, stretched too thin, or even quitting from the job.

Two weeks after the storm, more than half of the states were involved in providing shelter for evacuees. By four weeks after the storm, evacuees had been registered in all 50 states and in 18,700 zip codes—half of the nation's residential postal zones.

Criticism of government response

The criticisms of the government's response to Hurricane Katrina primarily consisted of criticism of mismanagement and lack of leadership in the relief efforts in response to the storm and its aftermath. More specifically, the criticism focused on the delayed response to the flooding of New Orleans, and the subsequent state of chaos in the city. The neologism Katrinagate was coined to refer to this controversy, and was a runner-up for "2005 word of the year".

Within days of Katrina's August 29 landfall, public debate arose about the local, state and federal governments' role in the preparations for and response to the hurricane. Criticism was initially prompted by televised images of visibly shaken and frustrated political leaders, and of residents who remained stranded by floodwaters without water, food, or shelter. Deaths from thirst, exhaustion and violence days after the storm had passed fueled the criticism, as did the dilemma of the evacuees at facilities such as the Louisiana Superdome and the New Orleans Civic Center. Some alleged that race, class, and other factors could have contributed to delays in government response. For example, during A Concert for Hurricane Relief, a benefit concert for victims of the hurricane, rapper Kanye West veered off script and harshly criticized the government's response to the crisis, stating that "George Bush doesn't care about black people."

In accordance with federal law, President George W. Bush directed the Secretary of the Department of Homeland Security, Michael Chertoff, to coordinate the Federal response. Chertoff designated Michael D. Brown, head of the Federal Emergency Management Agency, as the Principal Federal Official to lead the deployment and coordination of all federal response resources and forces in the Gulf Coast region. However, the President and Secretary Chertoff initially came under harsh criticism for what some perceived as a lack of planning and coordination. Brown claimed that Governor Blanco resisted their efforts and was unhelpful. Governor Blanco and her staff disputed this. Eight days later, Brown was recalled to Washington and Coast Guard Vice Admiral Thad W. Allen replaced him as chief of hurricane relief operations. Three days after the recall, Michael D. Brown resigned as director of FEMA in spite of having received recent praise from President Bush.

Politicians, activists, pundits, and journalists also directed criticism at the local and state governments headed by Mayor Nagin of New Orleans and Louisiana Governor Blanco. Nagin and Blanco were criticized for failing to implement New Orleans's evacuation plan and for ordering residents to a shelter of last resort without any provisions for food, water, security, or sanitary conditions. Perhaps the most important criticism of Nagin was that he delayed his emergency evacuation order until 19 hours before landfall, which led to hundreds of deaths of people who could not find any way out of the city.

The destruction wrought by Hurricane Katrina raised other, more general public policy issues about emergency management, environmental policy, poverty, and unemployment. The discussion of both the immediate response and of the broader public policy issues may have affected elections and legislation enacted at various levels of government. The storm's devastation also prompted a Congressional investigation, which found that FEMA and the Red Cross "did not have a logistics capacity sophisticated enough to fully support the massive number of Gulf coast victims". Additionally, it placed responsibility for the disaster on all three levels of government. An ABC News poll conducted on September 2, 2005, showed more blame was being directed at state and local governments (75%) than at the Federal government (67%), with 44% blaming Bush's leadership directly. A later CNN/USAToday/Gallup poll showed that respondents disagreed widely on who was to blame for the problems in the city following the hurricane—13% said Bush, 18% said federal agencies, 25% blamed state or local officials and 38% said no one was to blame.

International response

Over seventy countries pledged monetary donations or other assistance. Cuba and Venezuela (both considered as hostile to US government interest) were the first countries to offer assistance, pledging over $1 million, several mobile hospitals, water treatment plants, canned food, bottled water, heating oil, 1,100 doctors and 26.4 metric tons of medicine, though this aid was rejected by the U.S. government. Kuwait made the largest single pledge, $500 million; other large donations were made by Qatar and the United Arab Emirates (each $100 million), South Korea ($30 million), Australia ($10 million), India, China (both $5 million), New Zealand ($2 million), Pakistan ($1.5 million), Norway ($1.8 million), and Bangladesh ($1 million).

India sent tarps, blankets, and hygiene kits. An Indian Air Force IL-76 aircraft delivered 25 tonnes of relief supplies for the Hurricane Katrina victims at the Little Rock Air Force Base, Arkansas, on September 13, 2005.

Israel sent an IDF delegation to New Orleans to transport aid equipment including 80 tons of food, disposable diapers, beds, blankets, generators and additional equipment which were donated from different governmental institutions, civilian institutions, and the IDF. The Bush Administration announced in mid-September that it did not need Israeli divers and physicians to come to the United States for search and rescue missions, but a small team landed in New Orleans on September 10 to give assistance to operations already underway. The team administered first aid to survivors, rescued abandoned pets and discovered hurricane victims.

Countries like Sri Lanka, which was still recovering from the Indian Ocean Tsunami, also offered to help. Canada, Mexico, Singapore, and Germany sent supplies, relief personnel (like Technisches Hilfswerk), troops, ships and water pumps to aid in the disaster recovery. Belgium sent in a team of relief personnel. The United Kingdom's donation of 350,000 emergency meals did not reach victims because of laws regarding mad cow disease.

Russia's initial offer of two jets was declined by the U.S. State Department but accepted later. The French offer was also declined and requested later.

Non-governmental organization response

The American Red Cross, America's Second Harvest (now known as Feeding America), Southern Baptist Convention, Salvation Army, Oxfam, Common Ground Collective, Burners Without Borders, Emergency Communities, Habitat for Humanity, Catholic Charities, Direct Relief, Service International, "A River of Hope", The Church of Jesus Christ of Latter-day Saints, and many other charitable organizations provided aid to victims in the aftermath of the storm. They were not allowed into New Orleans proper by the National Guard for several days after the storm because of safety concerns. These organizations raised US$4.25 billion in donations from the public, with the Red Cross receiving over half of these donations. Some smaller organizations and individuals ignored the access restrictions and provided early relief. For example, two privately chartered planes from FasterCures evacuated 200 patients from Charity Hospital in New Orleans.

Volunteers from the Amateur Radio Emergency Service provided communications in areas where the communications infrastructure had been damaged or totally destroyed, relaying everything from 911 traffic to messages home. In Hancock County, Mississippi, ham radio operators provided the only communications into or out of the area and even served as 911 dispatchers.

Many private corporations also contributed to relief efforts. On September 13, 2005, it was reported that corporate donations amounted to $409 million, and were expected to exceed $1 billion.

During and after the Hurricanes Katrina, Wilma and Rita, the American Red Cross had opened 1,470 shelters and registered 3.8 million overnight stays. None were allowed in New Orleans, however. A total of 244,000 Red Cross workers (95% of which were non-paid volunteers) were utilized throughout these three hurricanes. In addition, 346,980 comfort kits (including such basic necessities as toothpaste, soap, washcloths, and toys for children) and 205,360 cleanup kits (containing brooms, mops, and bleach) were distributed. For mass care, the organization served 68 million snacks and meals to victims of the disasters and to rescue workers. The Red Cross also had its Disaster Health services meet 596,810 contacts, and Disaster Mental Health services met 826,590 contacts. Red Cross emergency financial assistance was provided to 1.4 million families. Hurricane Katrina was the first natural disaster in the United States in which the American Red Cross utilized its "Safe and Well" family location website.

Direct Relief provided a major response in the Gulf states so health providers could treat the local patients and evacuees. Direct Relief furnished $10 million in medical material aid and cash grants to support clinics and health centers in the area.

In the year following Katrina's strike on the Gulf Coast, The Salvation Army allocated donations of more than $365 million to serve more than 1.7 million people in nearly every state. The organization's immediate response to Hurricane Katrina included more than 5.7 million hot meals and about 8.3 million sandwiches, snacks, and drinks served in and around New Orleans. Its SATERN network of amateur radio operators picked up where modern communications left off to help locate more than 25,000 survivors. Salvation Army pastoral care counselors were on hand to comfort the emotional and spiritual needs of 277,000 individuals. As part of the overall effort, Salvation Army officers, employees, and volunteers contributed more than 900,000 hours of service.

Analysis of New Orleans levee failures

According to a modeling exercise conducted by the U.S. Army Corps of Engineers (USACE), two-thirds of the deaths in Greater New Orleans were due to levee and flood wall failure. On April 5, 2006, months after independent investigators had demonstrated that levee failures were not caused by natural forces beyond intended design strength, Lieutenant General Carl Strock, chief of engineers and commander of the Corps of Engineers, testified before the United States Senate Subcommittee on Energy and Water that "We have now concluded we had problems with the design of the structure."

A June 2007 report released by the American Society of Civil Engineers determined that the failures of the levees and flood walls in New Orleans were found to be primarily the result of system design and construction flaws. The U.S. Army Corps of Engineers had been federally mandated in the Flood Control Act of 1965 with responsibility for the conception, design, and construction of the region's flood-control system. All of the major studies in the aftermath of Katrina concluded that the USACE was responsible for the failure of the levees. This was primarily attributed to a decision to use shorter steel sheet pilings during construction in an effort to save money. That decision saved approximately US$100 million, but significantly reduced overall engineering reliability.

In January 2008, Judge Stanwood Duval of the U.S. District Court ruled that despite the Corps' role in the flooding, the agency could not be held financially liable because of sovereign immunity in the Flood Control Act of 1928. Exactly ten years after Katrina, J. David Rogers, lead author of a new report in the official journal of the World Water Council, concluded that the flooding during Katrina "could have been prevented had the corps retained an external review board to double-check its flood-wall designs".

Other factors may have contributed to the flooding. According to the authors of Catastrophe in the Making (Island Press, 2009), the straight design and lack of outward flow into the Gulf allowed the Mississippi River-Gulf Outlet Canal to become "the perfect shortcut for salt-water intrusion" which damaged buffering cypress forests and wetlands which historically had protected New Orleans from storm surge. The Army Corps of Engineers built and maintained the canal. Furthermore, according to storm surge researcher Hassan Mashriqui:

The Corps of Engineers disputes these causalities. Nonetheless, in June 2008, the Army Corps of Engineers New Orleans District submitted a Deep-Draft De-authorization Study of the MRGO which stated that "an economic evaluation of channel navigation use does not demonstrate a Federal interest in continued operation and maintenance of the channel." Congress ordered the MRGO closed as a direct result.

Many of the levees have been reconstructed since Katrina. In reconstructing them, precautions were taken to bring the levees up to modern building code standards and to ensure their safety. For example, in every situation possible, the Corps of Engineers replaced I-walls with T-walls, which have a horizontal concrete base that protects against soil erosion underneath the flood walls.

Funding battles continue over the remaining levee improvements. In February 2008, the Bush administration requested that the state of Louisiana pay about $1.5 billion of an estimated $7.2 billion for Corps of Engineers levee work (in accordance with the principles of local cost-sharing required by Congress as early as the Flood Control Act of 1928), a proposal which angered many Louisiana leaders. On May 2, 2008, Louisiana Governor Bobby Jindal used a speech to The National Press Club to request that President Bush free up money to complete work on Louisiana's levees. Bush promised to include the levee funding in his 2009 budget but rejected the idea of including the funding in a war bill, which would pass sooner.

Media involvement

Many representatives of the news media reporting on the aftermath of Hurricane Katrina became directly involved in the unfolding events, instead of simply reporting. Because of the loss of most means of communication, such as land-based and cellular telephone systems, field reporters in many cases became conduits for information between victims and authorities. The authorities, who monitored local and network news broadcasts, as well as internet sites, would then attempt to coordinate rescue efforts based on the reports. One illustration was when Geraldo Rivera of Fox News tearfully pleaded for authorities to either send help or evacuate the thousands of evacuees stranded at the Ernest N. Morial Convention Center. The role of AM radio was also of importance to the hundreds of thousands of persons with no other ties to news, providing emergency information regarding access to assistance for hurricane victims. Immediately after Katrina, WWL-AM was one of the few area radio stations in the area remaining on the air. This emergency service, simulcasted on shortwave outlet WHRI, was named "United Radio Broadcasters of New Orleans". Announcers continued to broadcast from improvised studio facilities after the storm damaged their main studios. The cellular phone antenna network was severely damaged and completely inoperable for several months.

The storm also brought a dramatic rise in the role of websites—especially blogging and community journalism. One example was the effort of NOLA.com, the web affiliate of New Orleans's Times-Picayune. A group of reporters were awarded the Breaking News Pulitzer Prize and shared the Public Service Pulitzer with the Biloxi-based Sun Herald. The newspaper's coverage was carried for days only on NOLA's blogs, as the newspaper lost its presses and evacuated its building as water rose around it on August 30. The site became an international focal point for news by local media, and also became a vital link for rescue operations and later for reuniting scattered residents, as it accepted and posted thousands of individual pleas for rescue on its blogs and forums. NOLA was monitored constantly by an array of rescue teams—from individuals to the Coast Guard—which used information in rescue efforts. Much of this information was relayed from trapped victims via the SMS functions of their cell phones, to friends and relatives outside the area, who then relayed the information back to NOLA.com. The aggregation of community journalism, user photos, and the use of the internet site as a collaborative response to the storm attracted international attention and was called a watershed moment in journalism. In the wake of these online-only efforts, the Pulitzer Committee for the first time opened all its categories to online entries.

As the U.S. military and rescue services regained control over the city, there were restrictions on the activity of the media. On September 9, the military leader of the relief effort announced that reporters would have "zero access" to efforts to recover bodies in New Orleans. Immediately following this announcement, CNN filed a lawsuit and obtained a temporary restraining order against the ban. The next day the government backed down and reversed the ban.

Retirement of name

Because of the large death toll and destruction of property along the Gulf Coast, the name Katrina was officially retired on April 6, 2006, by the World Meteorological Organization at the request of the U.S. government. The name will never again be used for another North Atlantic hurricane. It was replaced by Katia on List III of the Atlantic hurricane naming lists, which was used in the 2011 Atlantic hurricane season.

Studies concerning post-Katrina victims 
An article published in the Community Mental Health Journal from January 2016 revealed information about a recent study on the psychosocial needs of Hurricane Katrina evacuees that temporarily resided in Dallas, Texas. More than one-fourth of the sample met the criteria for major depressive disorder (MDD). About one-third of the individuals received a referral to mental health services for meeting symptom criteria for incident MDD and PTSD.

In a study published in Maternal and Child Health Journal, five to seven years after the disaster, 308 New Orleans pregnant women were interviewed about their exposure to Katrina. Researchers found that there were associations between experiencing damage during Katrina and birthweight, thus researchers concluded that natural disasters may have long-term effects on pregnancy outcomes. Furthermore, it was concluded that women who are most vulnerable to disaster may be more vulnerable to poor pregnancy outcome.

From a September 2015 journal of Current Psychology, a study examined the attitudes of older, long-term residents of Baton Rouge, Louisiana toward displaced newcomers to their community. After using multiple tests, analyses, and descriptive statistics, the study suggested residents grew to become more patient, tolerant, and friendly towards newcomers.  The study also suggests, however, that residents felt more fearful and suspicious of the evacuees, as well as the fact that they were being taken advantage of more.

Reconstruction

Reconstruction of each section of the southern portion of Louisiana has been addressed in the Army Corps LACPR (Louisiana Coastal Protection and Restoration) Final Technical Report, which identifies areas to not be rebuilt and areas where buildings need to be elevated.

The Technical Report includes:
 locations of possible new levees to be built
 suggested existing levee modifications
 "Inundation Zones", "Water depths less than 14 feet, Raise-In-Place of Structures", "Water depths greater than 14 feet, Buyout of Structures", "Velocity Zones" and "Buyout of Structures" areas for five different scenarios.

The U.S. Army Corps of Engineers submitted the report to the U.S. Congress for consideration, planning, and response in mid-2009.

Records
Katrina is the costliest tropical cyclone on record, tying with Hurricane Harvey in 2017. The storm was the fourth-most intense Atlantic hurricane on record to make landfall in the contiguous United States, behind the 1935 Labor Day hurricane, Hurricane Camille in 1969, and Hurricane Michael in 2018. Katrina was also the earliest eleventh named storm in the Atlantic until Tropical Storm Kyle surpassed it on August 14, 2020, beating Katrina by 10 days, as it was named on August 24, 2005.

See also

 List of Atlantic hurricanes
 List of Category 5 Atlantic hurricanes
 List of Florida hurricanes (2000–present)
 Wetlands of Louisiana
 Crescent Rising
 Hurricanes and climate change
 Hurricane Katrina in fiction
 Hurricane on the Bayou
 Katrina Aid Today
 Reconstruction of New Orleans
 Timeline of Hurricane Katrina
 U.S. Army Corps of Engineers civil works controversies (New Orleans)
 List of conspiracy theories
 North Sea flood of 1953

Other similar tropical cyclones
 Hurricane Betsy (1965) – Category 4 hurricane which had a similar track in the Gulf to Katrina; the first billion-dollar hurricane on record.
 Hurricane Camille (1969) – Category 5 hurricane that made the second-strongest U.S. landfall on record; impacted similar areas to Katrina.
 Hurricane Andrew (1992) - Category 5 hurricane that took a similar track and devastated similar areas.
 Hurricane Rita (2005) – Category 5 hurricane which struck the Gulf Coast of the United States at Category 3 intensity just a month after Katrina impacted Louisiana.
 Hurricane Harvey (2017) – Category 4 hurricane which made landfall in Texas and is the wettest cyclone in U.S. history; tied with Katrina as the costliest tropical cyclone on record.
 Hurricane Laura (2020) – Category 4 hurricane which struck near Cameron, Louisiana at peak intensity just one day prior to Katrina's 15th anniversary.
 Hurricane Ida (2021) – Category 4 hurricane which made landfall in Louisiana at peak intensity on the same day of Katrina's 16th anniversary.

Notes

References

Further reading

 
 
 
 
 
 
 
 
 Horowitz, Andy.  Katrina: A History, 1915–2015 (Harvard University Press, 2020), long-term scholarly perspective. 
 Camden Burd, "How To Plan A Disaster: Politics, Nature, and Hurricane Katrina" Reviews in American History (2021) 49#2 pp. 303–309 doi:10.1353/rah.2021.0030 online review
 Robinson, Sue. "A chronicle of chaos: Tracking the news story of Hurricane Katrina from The Times-Picayune to its website". Journalism 10.4 (2009): 431-450 online.
Rosenthal, Sandy. Words Whispered in Water: Why the Levees Broke in Hurricane Katrina (Mango, 2020), non-fiction account of author's battle to expose Army Corps of Engineers.
 
 
 
 
 Usher, Nikki. "Recovery from disaster: How journalists at the New Orleans Times-Picayune understand the role of a post-Katrina newspaper". Journalism Practice 3.2 (2009): 216-232.

External links

 National Hurricane Center's archive on Hurricane Katrina
 Hydrometeorological Prediction Center's archive on Hurricane Katrina
 NASA's Hurricane Katrina Archive
 Geology and Hurricane-Protection Strategies in the Greater New Orleans Area Louisiana Geological Survey publication on Hurricane Katrina
 Through Hell and High Water: Katrina's First Responders Oral History Project at   The Historic New Orleans Collection

Disaster recovery:
 Katrina's Angels Resource Coordination
 Houston's Noble Experiment – An article in the City Journal
 The KatrinaRitaVille Express Tour from Dollars & Sense magazine
 Beyond Katrina: The Voice of Recovery est. 8/28/2005 
 Katrina: The Debris - 10th anniversary podcast

Images:
 Hurricane Katrina's Aftermath Photos by StreetGangs.com
 Photographs and Video of Hurricane Katrina's Aftermath
 Weather satellite imagery (University of Wisconsin–Madison)
 Photographs of Hurricane Katrina's Aftermath

 
2005 Atlantic hurricane season
Articles containing video clips
Category 5 Atlantic hurricanes
George W. Bush administration controversies
Hurricanes in Florida
Hurricanes in Louisiana
Floods in Louisiana
Retired Atlantic hurricanes
August 2005 events in North America